Siberia is a 2018 thriller film directed by Matthew Ross and written by Scott B. Smith from a story by Stephen Hamel. It stars Keanu Reeves, Ana Ularu, Pasha D. Lychnikoff and Molly Ringwald.

Plot
American diamond merchant Lucas Hill travels to Russia to sell rare blue diamonds to gangster Boris Volkov. However, his contact in St. Petersburg, Pyotr who had the diamonds has gone missing. Boris threatens Lucas to deliver the diamonds in 48 hours.

Following Pyotr's clues, Lucas arrives at a guest house in Mirny, Siberia, a rough mining town. He briefly contacts his wife Gabby through Skype. He goes to a cafe and starts a fight with two drunks who are harrassing a cafe owner named Katya, who saves him after they jump him in the parking lot. Later, her brother Ivan suspects her of sleeping with Lucas, so she defiantly asks him to sleep with her.

Lucas meets Pyotr's brother Andrei who tells him that Pyotr sold counterfeit diamonds to a man named Samsonov and hid the real ones. Enraged, Lucas goes back to Katya's home. They start a passionate affair and Lucas lets Katya know that his relationship with his wife is more of a habit than a love story. Lucas goes bear hunting with Ivan and Katya's other brothers, who mock-threaten him. Lucas earns Ivan's respect when Lucas puts Ivan's dog out of its misery after accidentally being shot by Ivan’s brother.

Lucas returns to Pyotr's apartment in St. Petersburg to search again for the diamonds, and finds one hidden in a candle that is real. Remembering a similar candle in the Mirny guest house, he asks Katya to bring it to him, finding another diamond inside, which is a fake. Lucas meets Boris, along with Katya to show the real diamond promising him to return with the rest later. To solidify their deal, Boris demands a ritual of brotherhood where Boris’s woman services Lucas and Lucas' woman (Katya) services Boris. Reluctant at first, Lucas agrees when Boris convinces Katya that refusal of such an offer is deadly, so she tells Lucas to agree.

Returning to his hotel, Lucas is met by FSB agents who arrested Samsonov. They pressure Lucas to sell the fake diamonds to Boris, which Pyotr had sold to Samsonov, and get the money to the agents. In return, they promise him safe passage to home. Lucas and the FSB know that once Boris finds out, he will kill his wife and Katya and Lucas won't be able to hide long. Lucas manages to convince Boris to buy the diamonds and wire the money to the agents' account, but he gets a warning from Boris' henchman Pavel of the consequences if he is betraying him.

Pyotr's brother Andrei tells Lucas where to find Pyotr, hiding in an old farm in Siberia. With help from Katya's brother, Ivan, and with Katya tagging along, Lucas goes there and he and Ivan find Pyotr murdered, leaving no way to retrieve the real diamonds. Lucas tells Ivan to let Katya know that his love for her is real when everything is finished. Lucas promises to meet Katya the next morning, while Ivan lends him his hunting rifle, knowing that there is no other way this could end but violently with Boris's henchmen. Katya and Ivan leave and Lucas burns down the shack where Pyotr's body was found.

Pavel and a few henchmen find Lucas at the farmhouse. Lucas manages to kill some of the henchmen while trying to escape, but he is shot in the back by Pavel and dies.

Cast
 Keanu Reeves as Lucas Hill
 Ana Ularu as Katya
 Pasha D. Lychnikoff as Boris Volkov
 Molly Ringwald as Gabby Hill
 Rafael Petardi as Pavel
 Aleks Paunovic as Yefrem
 Boris Gulyarin as Pyotr
 Ashley St. George as Christa
 Taran Vitt as Lio

Production
In February 2017, it was announced Keanu Reeves had been cast in the film, with Matthew Ross directing from a screenplay by Scott B. Smith. Stephen Hamel, Reeves, and Gabriela Bacher will produce the film under their Company Films, Summerstorm Productions banners respectively. In April 2017, Aleks Paunovic, Pasha D. Lychnikoff, Ana Ularu, and Molly Ringwald joined the cast of the film.

Production began in May 2017. Some scenes have been filmed in Saint Petersburg; Siberian scenes have also been filmed in Manitoba, Canada, including the small towns of Cooks Creek and Marquette.

Release
In May 2018, Saban Films acquired distribution rights to the film. It had a limited domestically released in theaters on July 13, 2018, worldwide on July 20, 2018, and on VOD by Lionsgate Home Entertainment on September 18, 2018.

Reception

On Metacritic, the film has a weighted average score of 34 out of 100, based on 15 critics, indicating "generally unfavorable reviews".

References

External links
 
 

English-language Canadian films
2010s Russian-language films
2018 crime thriller films
Canadian crime thriller films
Canadian romantic thriller films
Saban Films films
Films set in Russia
American crime thriller films
American romantic thriller films
2010s romantic thriller films
Works by Scott Smith
2010s Canadian films
2010s American films
Canadian gangster films